Emilio Ángel Sánchez Vicario (born 29 May 1965) is a Spanish former doubles world No. 1 tennis player. He won five Grand Slam doubles titles and the men's doubles silver medal at the 1988 Olympic Games. Sanchez is the older brother of multiple Grand Slam winner Arantxa Sánchez Vicario, with whom he partnered to win the Hopman Cup in 1990. After retiring, he captained Spain to Davis Cup victory in 2008.

Career

Sánchez turned professional in 1984 and won his first top-level singles title in Nice, France in 1986. He won 15 singles titles during his career, including the Italian Open in 1991. During his singles career, he achieved wins over top 5 players including Ivan Lendl, Stefan Edberg, Boris Becker and Mats Wilander. His career-high singles ranking was world No. 7.

In men's doubles, Sánchez captured 50 men's doubles titles (44 of which partnering Sergio Casal) including three at Grand Slam events. In 1988, he won the men's doubles titles at both the French Open (with Andrés Gómez) and the US Open (with Casal). He won the French Open title again (with Casal) in 1990. Sánchez and Casal were also the men's doubles runners-up at Wimbledon in 1987, and the pair won the silver medal for Spain at the 1988 Olympic Games in Seoul. Sánchez was ranked world No. 1 in men's doubles in 1989.

He won two Grand Slam mixed-doubles titles in 1987, at the French Open (with Pam Shriver) and at the US Open (with Martina Navratilova).

Sánchez often played for Spain in international team events. He was a member of Spain's Davis Cup team from the mid-1980s to the mid-1990s, compiling a 32–23 record. Sanchez was also part of the Spanish teams that won the Hopman Cup in 1990 and the World Team Cup in 1992.

Sánchez is the brother of Javier Sánchez Vicario. In 1987, Emilio and Javier met in the final at Madrid, with Emilio winning the match 6–3, 3–6, 6–2. Emilio and Javier faced each other 12 times during their professional careers, with Emilio winning 10 of their matches. In their two grand slam encounters, Emilio defeated Javier in the first round of the 1988 Wimbledon Championships in straight sets, and the third round of the 1992 US Open in five sets.

Emilio Sánchez retired from the professional tour in 1998.

Post-retirement
In 1998, alongside his former doubles partner Casal, Sanchez set up the Sanchez-Casal Tennis Academy in Barcelona. Former students have included Andy Murray, Grigor Dimitrov, Daniela Hantuchova and Svetlana Kuznetsova.

Sanchez was the captain of the Spanish Davis Cup team for three years; his tenure there culminated in Spain's 2008 Davis Cup victory. He resigned as captain after the win.

In 2009, he signed a contract with the Brazilian tennis confederation to coordinate the sport in Brazil.

Sanchez was tournament director for two wheelchair tennis events in 2012.

In 2017, Sanchez was awarded by the ITF its highest accolade, the Philippe Chatrier Award, for his contributions to tennis.

Personal life
Sanchez was born in Madrid to Emilio Sanchez Snr and Marisa Vicario Rubin. His mother, Marisa, introduced Javier and his siblings into tennis.

As well as siblings Arantxa and Javier, he also has an older sister - Marisa Sanchez Vicario - who briefly played professional tennis, peaking at world no. 368 in 1990.

In 1999, Sanchez married his Italian-born wife Simona, with whom he has four children.

Grand Slam record
French Open
Singles quarterfinalist: 1988
Doubles champion: 1988 (partnering Andrés Gómez), 1990 (partnering Sergio Casal)
Mixed doubles champion: 1987 (partnering Pam Shriver)

US Open
Singles quarterfinalist: 1988
Doubles champion: 1988 (partnering Casal)
Mixed doubles champion: 1987 (partnering Martina Navratilova)

Wimbledon
Doubles finalist: 1987
Mixed doubles semifinalist: 1986

Career finals

Doubles (50 wins – 29 losses)

Singles (15 wins – 12 losses)

Doubles performance timeline

References

External links

 
 
 
 
 

1965 births
Living people
Tennis players from Madrid
Spanish male tennis players
French Open champions
Hopman Cup competitors
Olympic medalists in tennis
Olympic silver medalists for Spain
Olympic tennis players of Spain
Tennis players at the 1984 Summer Olympics
Tennis players at the 1988 Summer Olympics
Tennis players at the 1992 Summer Olympics
US Open (tennis) champions
Grand Slam (tennis) champions in mixed doubles
Grand Slam (tennis) champions in men's doubles
Wheelchair tennis in Spain
Medalists at the 1988 Summer Olympics
ATP number 1 ranked doubles tennis players